Mary White (born 7 October 1944) is an Irish businesswoman and former Fianna Fáil politician. She was a member of Seanad Éireann on the Industrial and Commercial Panel from September 2002, until April 2016 when she stood down.

Born in Dundalk in 1944, she is married to Padraic White, and they have one daughter. She has an Arts degree in Economics and Politics from University College Dublin and a Higher Diploma in Architectural Technology from the Dublin Institute of Technology. White co-founded Lir Chocolates in 1987.

She was first elected to the Seanad in 2002 and was re-elected in 2007 and in 2011.

On 6 February 2008, White declared her candidacy to succeed Mary McAleese as President of Ireland. She was seeking the nomination of the Fianna Fáil party and was the first candidate to declare her intention to run. In May 2011, she said that she would not be seeking a nomination.  She stood down at the April 2016 election, having failed to be elected to the Dáil in the February 2016 general election.

In the Seanad she was the Fianna Fáil Seanad spokesperson on Enterprise, Jobs and Innovation.

References

External links
Mary White's page on the Fianna Fáil website

1944 births
Living people
Members of the 22nd Seanad
Members of the 23rd Seanad
Members of the 24th Seanad
21st-century women members of Seanad Éireann
Fianna Fáil senators
Politicians from County Louth
Alumni of University College Dublin
Alumni of Dublin Institute of Technology